Pescado Rabioso (Rabid Fish) were an Argentinian rock band led by Argentine musician Luis Alberto Spinetta from 1971 to 1973. Initially a trio accompanied by drummer Black Amaya and bassist Osvaldo "Bocón" Frascino, they became a quartet with the addition of keyboardist Carlos Cutaia. Finally, David Lebón replaced Frascino in 1972 and featured on the album Pescado 2.

In spite of their short life, they are still considered an important and influential piece of Argentine rock history. They were the second major band of Spinetta, created after Almendra's break up in the late 1960s and a seven-month trip through Brazil, United States and Europe.

Although labeled under the band's name due to legal terms with his record company, Pescado Rabioso's final album Artaud is actually a complete solo effort from Spinetta.

The song Stepdad from Eminem's album Music to Be Murdered By (2020) samples Pescado Rabioso's Peteribí from Pescado 2.

Discography

Studio albums
 Desatormentándonos (1972)
 Pescado 2 (1973)
 Artaud (1973)

Compilation albums
 Lo mejor de Pescado Rabioso (1976)
 Obras cumbres (2000)

Singles
 "Post-crucifixión" / "Despiértate nena" (1972)
 "Me gusta ese tajo" / "Credulidad" (1973)
 "Todas las hojas son del viento" / "Superchería" (1973)

Filmography
 Hasta que se ponga el sol (1973)
 Pescado Rabioso, una utopía incurable (2012)

External links

Pescado Rabioso Biography (Spanish)
Fan site with information (Spanish)

Argentine progressive rock groups
Argentine hard rock musical groups
Blues rock groups
Folk rock groups
Psychedelic rock music groups